Percival Stanley Malbon (7 October 1917 – 21 July 2007) was an Australian rules footballer who played with Footscray in the Victorian Football League (VFL).

Notes

External links 
		

1917 births
2007 deaths
Australian rules footballers from Melbourne
Western Bulldogs players
People from Yarraville, Victoria